Cheung Muk Tau is a village of in the Shap Sze Heung area of Sai Kung North, in Tai Po District, Hong Kong.

Administration
Despite its proximity to the neighbouring areas administered by Sha Tin and Sai Kung districts, Cheung Muk Tau is actually administered by Tai Po District. It is covered by the Sai Kung North constituency of the Tai Po District Council, which is currently represented by Ben Tam Yi-pui. Cheung Muk Tau is a recognized village under the New Territories Small House Policy.

References

External links

 Delineation of area of existing village Cheung Muk Tau (Sai Kung North) for election of resident representative (2019 to 2022)

Villages in Tai Po District, Hong Kong
Sai Kung North